The 2019–20 Liga IV Alba was the 52nd season of the Liga IV Alba, the fourth tier of the Romanian football league system. The season began on 24 August 2019 and was ended officially on 15 June 2020, due to 2019–20 COVID-19 pandemic. Ocna Mureș was crowned as county champion.

Team changes

To Liga IV Alba
Relegated from Liga III
 Ocna MureșPromoted from Liga V Alba Performanţa Ighiu
 Universitatea Alba Iulia

From Liga IV AlbaPromoted to Liga III
 —

Relegated to Liga V Alba
 Dacia Mihalț

Other changes
 Inter Unirea was enrolled to championship on demand.
 Metalul Aiud and Sportul Petreşti  withdrew from Liga IV due to financial problems.

League table

Promotion play-off

Champions of Liga IV – Alba County face champions of Liga IV – Brașov County and Liga IV – Harghita County.

Region 3 (Center)

Group B

See also

Main Leagues
 2019–20 Liga I
 2019–20 Liga II
 2019–20 Liga III
 2019–20 Liga IV

County Leagues (Liga IV series)

 2019–20 Liga IV Arad
 2019–20 Liga IV Argeș
 2019–20 Liga IV Bacău
 2019–20 Liga IV Bihor
 2019–20 Liga IV Bistrița-Năsăud
 2019–20 Liga IV Botoșani
 2019–20 Liga IV Brăila
 2019–20 Liga IV Brașov
 2019–20 Liga IV Bucharest
 2019–20 Liga IV Buzău
 2019–20 Liga IV Călărași
 2019–20 Liga IV Caraș-Severin
 2019–20 Liga IV Cluj
 2019–20 Liga IV Constanța
 2019–20 Liga IV Covasna
 2019–20 Liga IV Dâmbovița
 2019–20 Liga IV Dolj
 2019–20 Liga IV Galați 
 2019–20 Liga IV Giurgiu
 2019–20 Liga IV Gorj
 2019–20 Liga IV Harghita
 2019–20 Liga IV Hunedoara
 2019–20 Liga IV Ialomița
 2019–20 Liga IV Iași
 2019–20 Liga IV Ilfov
 2019–20 Liga IV Maramureș
 2019–20 Liga IV Mehedinți
 2019–20 Liga IV Mureș
 2019–20 Liga IV Neamț
 2019–20 Liga IV Olt
 2019–20 Liga IV Prahova
 2019–20 Liga IV Sălaj
 2019–20 Liga IV Satu Mare
 2019–20 Liga IV Sibiu
 2019–20 Liga IV Suceava
 2019–20 Liga IV Teleorman
 2019–20 Liga IV Timiș
 2019–20 Liga IV Tulcea
 2019–20 Liga IV Vâlcea
 2019–20 Liga IV Vaslui
 2019–20 Liga IV Vrancea

References

External links
 Official website 

 
Sport in Alba County